Aleksandr Yakovlevich Mikhailov (born 4 October 1944) is a Soviet and Russian actor. He has appeared in 42 films since 1973. He starred in the 1981 film Muzhiki! which was entered into the 32nd Berlin International Film Festival, where it won an Honourable Mention.

People's Artist of the RSFSR (1992). People's Artist of the Pridnestrovian Moldavian Republic (2014).

Social position
On 12 February 2015, Ukraine's Security Service banned Mikhailov from entering Ukraine for five years for public supporting the Luhansk People's Republic and the Donetsk People's Republic and a visit to the territory under the control of the rebels.

Selected filmography
Aleksandr Mikhailov has starred in over 81 films.
 Muzhiki! (1981) as Pavel
 Per Aspera Ad Astra (1981) as Dreier
 Carnival (1981) as Remizov
 Plead Guilty (1983) as Voronin
 Offered for Singles (1983) as Victor P. Frolov, commander
 Snake Catcher (1985) as Pavel Sergeevich Shorokhov
 Love and Doves (1985) as Vasily Kuzyakin
 Bless the Woman (2003) as Yurlov
 Yesenin (2005) as Alexander Khlystov
 Mata Hari (TV Mini-Series 2016) as Semikhin

References

External links

 
 Official site

1944 births
Living people
People from Olovyanninsky District
Soviet male film actors
Soviet male stage actors
Soviet male television actors
Russian male film actors
Russian male stage actors
Russian male television actors
Male actors from Moscow
20th-century Russian male actors
21st-century Russian male actors
People's Artists of the RSFSR
Recipients of the Vasilyev Brothers State Prize of the RSFSR
Recipients of the Lenin Komsomol Prize
A Just Russia politicians
21st-century Russian politicians
Recipients of the Order of Honour (Russia)